Thélus is a commune in the Pas-de-Calais department in the Hauts-de-France region of France.

See also
 Communes of the Pas-de-Calais department

References

External links

 
 Nine Elms CWGC cemetery
 Zivy Crater CWGC cemetery
 Lichfield Crater CWGC cemetery
 Bois-Carré CWGC cemetery
 The CWGC military cemetery at Thélus
 The communal cemetery
 Dossier complet : Commune de Thélus (62810), INSEE
 

\\

Communes of Pas-de-Calais